Bruno Ricardo Mendonça de Caires (born 2 April 1976) is a Portuguese retired footballer who played as a defensive midfielder.

Club career
A product of S.L. Benfica's youth system, Lisbon-born Caires was initially loaned to C.F. Os Belenenses in his first year as senior, where he made his Primeira Liga debuts. He returned in the 1995 summer, playing 24 competitive games during the season to help his team finish in second position.

In the 1997 summer, Caires signed for Celta de Vigo, who paid €3.5 million for his services. He made his La Liga debut on 9 November by coming on as a late substitute in a 3–1 away win against CD Tenerife, but his spell in Spain was plagued by injury problems, and he was also loaned to precisely Tenerife in January 2000.

Subsequently, Caires returned to Lisbon, signing for Sporting Clube de Portugal. He mainly played for its B-side in competitive matches, his only first-team appearances being against Real Madrid in the UEFA Champions League and F.C. Famalicão in the Portuguese Cup. He retired in 2005 at the age of only 29 after spells with F.C. Maia, S.C. Covilhã and Louletano DC, the latter two clubs competing in the third tier.

International career
Caires participated with the Portugal under-20 team at the 1995 FIFA World Youth Championship, contributing with six games to an eventual third-place finish in Qatar. All youth categories comprised, he gained 52 caps and scored two goals.

Honours
Benfica
Taça de Portugal: 1995–96

References

External links

1976 births
Living people
Footballers from Lisbon
Portuguese footballers
Association football midfielders
Primeira Liga players
Liga Portugal 2 players
Segunda Divisão players
S.L. Benfica footballers
C.F. Os Belenenses players
Sporting CP footballers
Sporting CP B players
F.C. Maia players
S.C. Covilhã players
Louletano D.C. players
La Liga players
Segunda División players
RC Celta de Vigo players
CD Tenerife players
Portugal youth international footballers
Portugal under-21 international footballers
Portuguese expatriate footballers
Expatriate footballers in Spain
Portuguese expatriate sportspeople in Spain